Sue Haywood (born October 9, 1971) is a retired professional mountain bike racer.  She raced for team Trek Volkswagen along with notables Jeremiah Bishop, Travis Brown, Chris Eatough, Lea Davison and Ross Schnell.

Sue Haywood was awarded $318,647.14 in a civil case against USA Cycling for not being awarded a spot on the 2004 Olympic Team after a sketchy selection process.

Major wins
2007
1st Transrockies—Open Women (2-person team with HIllary Harrison)
1st Shenandoah 100 - New course record
2006
1st Solo World Championships by 24 Hours of Adrenalin
1st Shenandoah 100
1st NORBA National Short Track Championships
1st NORBA National Super-D Championships
2005
1st Overall, NORBA #2, Arizona
1st, TT NORBA #2
2004
1st, Chequamagon Fat Tire Festival
1st, Great Wall Cycling Festival, Beijing, China
1st, Pan American Championships
2003
1st overall, NORBA Short Track Championship
1st NORBA NCS STXC, Big Bear, California
1st Stage 1, Subaru Nova Desert Classic
1st Stage 2, Subaru Nova Desert Classic
2002
1st Team, 24 Hours of Moab, Moab, Utah
2001
US Short Track Champion 1st, UCI World Cup, Time Trial, Durango, Colorado
1st, 24 Hours of Moab, Utah

External links
 
 
 
 May 2005 interview by Cycling News
 

1971 births
Living people
American female cyclists
Marathon mountain bikers
Place of birth missing (living people)
21st-century American women